13th Street (France: 13ème Rue, Spain: Calle 13 and Poland: 13 Ulica) is a television channel specializing in action, suspense and police procedural programs and movies, mainly from the Universal Pictures and Television libraries. It is owned by NBCUniversal and was inaugurated in France in 1997, quickly adding local versions across Europe, Australia, New Zealand and Russia.

The channel changed its name to 13th Street Universal on 13 October 2010. The additional "Universal" notation was dropped in March 2017 as part of a reimage effort. Local versions of the network began to shut down in the mid-2010s in deference to streaming services, including NBCUniversal's own Hayu and Peacock.

See also
 13th Street Australia
 13ème Rue France, Switzerland & Wallonia
 13th Street Germany, Austria & Switzerland
 Calle 13 Spain

References

External links
13th Street Australia 
13ème Rue France
13th Street Germany
13 Ulica Poland
Calle 13 Spain

Television channels and stations established in 1997
Defunct television channels in the Netherlands
Defunct television channels in Belgium
Universal Networks International
NBCUniversal networks